The Walden Veterans' Memorial Bridge, sometimes referred as the Walden High Bridge, from its predecessor, carries NY 52 over the Wallkill River in the Orange County village of Walden, New York, United States. It is the more heavily used of the two bridges in the village.

The current bridge was built between 2003 and 2005 when its predecessor, a steel truss bridge built in the 1920s, had to be completely torn down due to severe deterioration of the support foundations. While construction was underway, traffic on Route 52 was diverted down Oak Street to the Walden Low Bridge. The new bridge features some architectural improvements, such as lighting and wide sidewalks on both sides.

The bridge was officially renamed in honor of the village's war veterans under state law passed in 2004.
Banners naming individual residents and commemorating their service flutter from the decorative lampposts along the bridge.

References

External links 
Route 52 over the Wallkill River. NYSDOT page.

Bridges in Orange County, New York
Bridges completed in 2005
Bridges over the Wallkill River
Monuments and memorials in New York (state)
Concrete bridges in the United States
Road bridges in New York (state)
Open-spandrel deck arch bridges in the United States